The Police Roll of Honour Trust is a charitable organisation registered in England & Wales and Scotland, it was founded in 2000 and records all those British police officers who have died on and in the line of duty. It has been granted a Royal Charter.

Royal charter
In November 2016, the Privy Council of the United Kingdom considered the petition of the Police Roll of Honour Trust to be granted incorporation by royal charter, in March 2018 the royal charter was approved by Elizabeth II and presented to the charity by ex Commissioner of Police of the Metropolis Sir Bernard Hogan-Howe QPM.

The trust worked with the College of Arms to create their crown badge that was approved by Elizabeth II in 2009.

Police Roll of Honour
The Police Roll of Honour Trust researches and maintains the UK Police Roll of Honour and has provided this for various other organisations. The complete UK Police Roll of Honour is displayed at the National Police Memorial, it is laid out by day and lists all those Police Officers who have died on that day throughout history. There are roughly 4,000 names contained within the UK Police Roll of Honour, but ongoing research is slowly adding to that total.

Patrons
There are four patrons, they are Dame Cressida Dick, Iain Livingstone, Martin Hewitt, and Matt Jukes.

Cyprus Police Memorial
During the Cyprus Emergency there were a number of British police officers sent to Cyprus to help the local police. British soldiers and police became embroiled and were seen as legitimate targets of the EOKA group. Eight United Kingdom Police Unit officers were killed at the hands of terrorists, and three more died due to other causes. In 2014, the Police Roll of Honour Trust unveiled a new Cyprus Police Memorial.

See also
 Police Memorial Trust
 List of British police officers killed in the line of duty

References

External links

Charities based in the United Kingdom